Delfines UGM is a Mexican football club that plays in the Tercera División de México. The club is based in  Nogales, Veracruz, and represents the University of the Gulf of Mexico (Universidad del Golfo de México).

Roster

See also
Futbol in Mexico
Veracruz
Tercera División de México

References

External links
Official Page

Football clubs in Veracruz
2008 establishments in Mexico